The 2001 Berlin Thunder season was the third season for the franchise in the NFL Europe League (NFLEL). The team was led by head coach Peter Vaas in his second year, and played its home games at Jahn-Sportpark in Berlin, Germany. They finished the regular season in second place with a record of six wins and four losses. In World Bowl IX, Berlin defeated the Barcelona Dragons 24–17. The victory marked the franchise's first World Bowl championship.

Offseason

Free agent draft

Personnel

Staff

Roster

Schedule

Standings

Game summaries

Week 1: vs Barcelona Dragons

World Bowl IX

Notes

References

Berlin
Berlin Thunder seasons